Madhu Yadav is former Captain of the India women's national field hockey team. She is a 1986 Asian Games bronze-medallist. She has also received the Arjuna Award in 2000 from the President of India.  She has also coached the team after her retirement. She is from Jabalpur, Madhya Pradesh. She is a recipient of the Vikram Award from the Government of Madhya Pradesh.

References 

Recipients of the Arjuna Award
Indian female field hockey players
Field hockey players at the 1986 Asian Games
20th-century Indian women
20th-century Indian people
Medalists at the 1986 Asian Games
Asian Games medalists in field hockey
Asian Games bronze medalists for India
Field hockey players from Madhya Pradesh
People from Jabalpur
People from Madhya Pradesh
Year of birth missing (living people)
Living people